Sir Michael Houghton (born 1949) is a British scientist and Nobel Prize laureate. Along with Qui-Lim Choo, George Kuo and Daniel W. Bradley, he co-discovered Hepatitis C in 1989. He also co-discovered the Hepatitis D genome in 1986. The discovery of the Hepatitis C virus (HCV) led to the rapid development of diagnostic reagents to detect HCV in blood supplies, which has reduced the risk of acquiring HCV through blood transfusion from one in three to about one in two million. It is estimated that antibody testing has prevented at least 40,000 new infections per year in the US alone and many more worldwide.

Houghton is currently Canada Excellence Research Chair in Virology and Li Ka Shing Professor of Virology at the University of Alberta, where he is also director of the Li Ka Shing Applied Virology Institute. He is the co-recipient of the 2020 Nobel Prize in Physiology or Medicine along with Harvey J. Alter and Charles M. Rice.

Early life and education 
Born in the United Kingdom in 1949, his father was a truck driver and union official. He was educated at Alleyn's School. At the age of 17 he became inspired to become a microbiologist after reading about Louis Pasteur. Houghton won a scholarship to study at the University of East Anglia, graduating with a lower second class honours degree in biological sciences in 1972, and subsequently completed his PhD degree in biochemistry at King's College London in 1977.

Career 

Houghton joined G. D. Searle & Company before moving to Chiron Corporation in 1982. It was at Chiron that Houghton together with colleagues Qui-Lim Choo and George Kuo, and Daniel W. Bradley from the Centers for Disease Control and Prevention, first discovered evidence for HCV.

Houghton was co-author of a series of seminal studies published in 1989 and 1990 that identified hepatitis C antibodies in blood, particularly among patients at higher risk of contracting the disease, including those who had received blood transfusions. This work led to the development of a blood screening test in 1990; widespread blood screening that began in 1992 with the development of a more sensitive test has since virtually eliminated hepatitis C contamination of donated blood supplies in Canada. In other studies published during the same period, Houghton and collaborators linked hepatitis C with liver cancer.

In 2013, Houghton's team at the University of Alberta showed that a vaccine derived from a single strain of Hepatitis C was effective against all strains of the virus.  the vaccine was in pre-clinical trials.

Honours and awards 

 1992 – Karl Landsteiner Memorial Award
 1993 – Robert Koch Prize
 1994 – William Beaumont Prize

 2000 – Lasker Award
 2005 – Dale A. Smith Memorial Award
 2009 – Hepdart Lifetime Achievement Award
 2013 – He became the first person to decline the $100,000 Gairdner Foundation International Award stating "I felt that it would be unfair of me to accept this award without the inclusion of two colleagues, Dr. Qui-Lim Choo and Dr. George Kuo."
 2019 – Honorary doctorate of science from the University of East Anglia
 2020 – Nobel Prize in Physiology or Medicine
 2021 – Knighted in the 2021 Birthday Honours for services to medicine.

References

External links 

 

1949 births
Living people
People educated at Alleyn's School
Alumni of the University of East Anglia
Alumni of King's College London
British microbiologists
British virologists
Canada Research Chairs
Recipients of the Lasker-DeBakey Clinical Medical Research Award
Academic staff of the University of Alberta
Nobel laureates in Physiology or Medicine
British Nobel laureates
Knights Bachelor